The 2022–23 Eredivisie is the 67th season of Eredivisie, the premier football competition in the Netherlands. It began on 5 August 2022 and will conclude on 28 May 2023. As the 2022 FIFA World Cup will start on 20 November, the last round before stoppage will be held on 12–13 November. The league will resume games on 6 January.

Teams
FC Emmen (promoted after a one-year absence), FC Volendam (promoted after a thirteen-year absence) and Excelsior (promoted after a three-year absence) were promoted from the 2021–22 Eerste Divisie. PEC Zwolle (relegated after ten years in the top flight), Willem II (relegated after eight years in the top flight) and Heracles Almelo (relegated after seventeen years in the top flight) have been relegated to the 2022–23 Eerste Divisie.

Stadiums and locations

Number of teams by province

Personnel and kits

Managerial changes

Standings

League table

Results

Fixtures and results

Results by round

Statistics

Top scorers

Hat-tricks

Top assists

Clean sheets

Discipline

Player
 Most yellow cards: 8
  Edson Álvarez (Ajax)
  Maximilian Wittek (Vitesse)
  Burak Yılmaz (Fortuna Sittard)

 Most red cards: 2
  Iliass Bel Hassani (RKC Waalwijk)
  Doğan Erdoğan (Fortuna Sittard)
  Mees Hoedemakers (Cambuur)

Club
 Most yellow cards: 50
 Fortuna Sittard
 Most red cards: 4
 Cambuur
 Vitesse
 Fewest yellow cards: 30
 Sparta Rotterdam
 Fewest red cards: 0
 Feyenoord
 Utrecht

Awards

Monthly awards

References

External links

Eredivisie seasons
1
Netherlands
Netherlands